Pooja Motwani is an Indian fashion designer from Delhi known for Ajrak organic wear kaftans and Indo-Western clothing.

Career
In July 2013, she launched her wedding collection store named 'JAS' in Delhi. Motwani is involved in many events, including My Rajasthan Festival, My Rajasthan Concept, and the Empowering Award.

Achievements
Motwani has received both the Golden Achievers Award from the Mann Still Foundation and Sewa Puraskar Award. In a poll from 2019, Motwani voted Mr. Narendra Modi as her favorite dressed politician.

See also 

 Manish Arora
 Varija Bajaj
 Ritu Beri

References 

Indian women fashion designers
Living people
Year of birth missing (living people)